Zizzle was a company based in Bannockburn, Illinois, United States, that made many types of electronics and toys based on original concepts as well as movie licenses. They are best known for a toy called "iZ".

History 
The Zizzle company was founded in 2005 by Roger Shiffman, co-founder of Tiger Electronics, along with the marketing guru behind Furby, Marc Rosenberg.  Shiffman credits his wife for the name of the company.

The first toy released by the company was called "iZ", and received comparisons to the Furby.

The company received licenses to produce toys for Disney's Pirates of the Caribbean franchise, and also Nickelodeon's SpongeBob SquarePants and Dora the Explorer cartoons.

Zizzle shut down in 2009.

Toys and licences 
Zizzle iZ Toy
Zoundz music mixing toy with RFID sound selection pieces (in association with Big Monster Toys)
Disney's Pirates of the Caribbean 1:18 scale action figures and playsets
Marvel Comics' Zizzlingers

See also
 Action figure

References

External links 
 

Toy companies of the United States
Companies based in Lake County, Illinois